Alcides metaurus or North Queensland Day Moth is a moth of the family Uraniidae. It is known from the tropical north of Queensland, Australia.

Description 
The wingspan is about 100 mm. Adults are black with iridescent bands of yellow and pink. The underside is iridescent pale green with black bands. They are on wing during the day and feed on flower nectar. They rest with their wings open and out flat.

The larvae feed on various Euphorbiaceae species, including Endospermum medullosum, E. myrmecophilum, and Omphalea queenslandiae. These plants contain poisons which might protect the larvae from predation. The various instars have colours varying from green with a black band, to black with white bands and a red thorax, to red with black bands and orange legs. Pupation takes place in a cocoon made in a crevice or between dead leaves.

Distribution 
It is found in Queensland and around New Guinea.

References

Uraniidae
Moths described in 1763
Taxa named by Carl Linnaeus